Kumakawa (written:  lit. "bear river") is a Japanese surname. Notable people with the surname include:

, Japanese Paralympic goalball player
, Japanese ballet dancer

Japanese-language surnames